ABS Friction is a Canadian brake manufacturer. Headquartered in Guelph, Ontario, Canada, ABS Friction Inc. produces aftermarket brake pads for more than 1 700 types of vehicles in 27 countries. Originally a private label company, ABS launched their own brand, IDEAL Brake Parts Inc., in 2009.

ABS Friction Inc. was founded in 1995 by Rick Jamieson, Joe Schmidt, and Ralph Neil.

References

Manufacturing companies established in 1995
Canadian companies established in 1995
Companies based in Guelph
1995 establishments in Ontario